A Kachchh shawl is a traditional shawl woven in the Kutch region of the Gujarat, India. These are largely woven with Kachchhi motifs in Bhujodi village of Kutch. Traditionally Kachchhi weavers belong to Marwada and Maheswari communities. 

Kachchhi shawls have received geographical indication tag under the Geographical Indications of Goods (Registration and Protection) Act, 1999.

Origin
There are two stories about the migration of weavers into the Kutch region around 500 years ago. According to the first story a girl belonging to a rich Rabari family was married to a man in Kutch and she was given a weaver in dowry. This family of weavers grew into a large community in the following years. The second story is related to Ramdev Pir who came to Kutch from Rajasthan. Soon enough some of his followers built a temple in his praise and asked him to bring some of his kin from Marwar, Rajasthan to take care of the temple. This led to the settlement of the Meghwal community of weavers in Kutch.

Types of shawls 
 Embroidered Shawl
 Tie Dyed Shawl
 Stole

References

Gujarati culture
Kutch district
Culture of Kutch
Geographical indications in Gujarat
Indian shawls and wraps